Romain Le Roux (born 3 July 1992 in Guipavas) is a French former track and road cyclist, who rode professionally between 2015 and 2020, for the  and  teams.

Major results

2015
 8th Cholet-Pays de Loire
2017
 5th Overall Ronde de l'Oise
 5th Polynormande

References

External links

1992 births
Living people
French male cyclists